The Daytime Emmy Award for Outstanding Children's Series was an Emmy award given to television programming aimed towards children. Children's television had been recognized at the Emmys since the inaugural year. In 1995, a separate award for pre-school children's television was created, and the two categories had been recognized since then. Starting in 2018, a distinction between children's series and educational series was created, resulting in two separate categories. In November 2021, it was announced that all Daytime Emmy categories honoring children's programming will be retired in favor of a separate Children's & Family Emmy Awards ceremony that will be held starting in 2022.

Winners and Nominees 
Winners in bold

Outstanding Entertainment Children's Series 
1974
 Zoom (PBS)
 Captain Kangaroo (CBS)
 Fat Albert and the Cosby Kids (CBS)
 Star Trek: The Animated Series (NBC)
1975
 Star Trek: The Animated Series (NBC)
 Captain Kangaroo (CBS)
 The Pink Panther Show (NBC)
1976
 Big Blue Marble (SYN)
 Captain Kangaroo (CBS)
 Fat Albert and the Cosby Kids (CBS)
 Zoom (PBS)
1977
 Zoom (PBS)
 Captain Kangaroo (CBS)
 Once Upon a Classic ("David Copperfield") (PBS)
 Once Upon a Classic ("Heidi") (PBS)
 Once Upon a Classic ("The Prince and the Pauper") (PBS)
1978
 Captain Kangaroo (CBS)
 Once Upon a Classic ("Robin Hood") (PBS)
 Zoom (PBS)
1979
 Kids Are People Too (ABC)
 Captain Kangaroo (CBS)
 Once Upon a Classic ("John Halifax, Gentleman") (PBS)
 Once Upon a Classic ("Lorna Doone") (PBS)
 Once Upon a Classic ("The Secret Garden") (PBS)
1980
 Hot Hero Sandwich (NBC)
 Captain Kangaroo (CBS)
 Kids Are People Too (ABC)
 Once Upon a Classic ("Leatherstocking Tales") (PBS)
1981
 Captain Kangaroo (CBS)
 Once Upon a Classic ("A Tale of Two Cities") (PBS)
 ABC Weekend Specials (ABC)
 Once Upon a Classic ("The Legend of King Arthur") (PBS)
1982
 Captain Kangaroo (CBS)
 ABC Weekend Specials (ABC)
1983
 Smurfs (NBC)
 Captain Kangaroo (CBS)
1984
 Captain Kangaroo (CBS)
 Smurfs (NBC)

Outstanding Children's Instructional Programming 
1976
 Schoolhouse Rock! (ABC)
 Mister Rogers' Neighborhood (PBS)
 Sesame Street (PBS)
1977
 Sesame Street (PBS)
 Villa Alegre (PBS)
1978
 Schoolhouse Rock! (ABC)
 Sesame Street (PBS)
1979
 Schoolhouse Rock! ("Science Rock") (ABC)
 Dear Alex and Annie (ABC)
 The Metric Marvels (NBC)
 Sesame Street (PBS)

Outstanding Informational Children's Series 
1976
 Go (NBC)
 The Electric Company (PBS)
 Make a Wish (ABC)
1977
 The Electric Company (PBS)
 ABC Minute Magazine (ABC)
 Animals, Animals, Animals (ABC)
 Schoolhouse Rock! (ABC)
1978
 Animals, Animals, Animals (ABC)
 ABC Minute Magazine (ABC)
 Villa Alegre (PBS)
1979
 Big Blue Marble (SYN)
 ABC Minute Magazine (ABC)
 30 Minutes (CBS)
 Animals, Animals, Animals (ABC)
 In the News (CBS)
 NBC Special Treat ("When You Turn Off The Set, Turn On A Book") (NBC)

Outstanding Children's Informational/Instructional Series 
1980
 Sesame Street (PBS)
 30 Minutes (CBS)
 Mister Rogers' Neighborhood (PBS)
1981
 30 Minutes (CBS)
 Animals, Animals, Animals (ABC)
 Kids Are People Too (ABC)
 Sesame Street (PBS)
1982
 30 Minutes (CBS)
 Kids Are People Too (ABC)
 Sesame Street (PBS)
1983
 Sesame Street (PBS)
 Mister Rogers' Neighborhood (PBS)
1984
 ABC Weekend Special (ABC)
 Mister Rogers' Neighborhood (PBS)
 Sesame Street (PBS)

Outstanding Children's Informational/Instructional Programming - Short Form 
1980
 Ask NBC News (NBC)
 H.E.L.P! - Dr. Henry's Emergency Lessons for People (ABC)
 In the News (CBS)
 Schoolhouse Rock! (ABC)
 NBC Special Treat ("When You Turn Off The Set, Turn On A Book") (NBC)
1981
 ABC Nutrition Spots (ABC)
 Ask NBC News (NBC)
 The Doughnuts (ABC)
 In the News (CBS)
1982
 In the News (CBS)
 Ask NBC News (NBC)
 Betcha Don't Know (NBC)
1983
 In the News (CBS)
 Willie Survive (ABC)
1984
 Young People's Special ("Just Another Stupid Kid") (SYN)

Outstanding Children's Series 
1985
 Sesame Street (PBS)
 Kidsworld (ABC)
 3-2-1 Contact (PBS)
 Mister Rogers' Neighborhood (PBS)
 Pryor's Place (CBS)
1986
 Sesame Street (PBS)
 3-2-1 Contact (PBS)
 Mister Rogers' Neighborhood (PBS)
1987
 Sesame Street (PBS)
 3-2-1 Contact (PBS)
 Mister Rogers' Neighborhood (PBS)
 Pee-wee's Playhouse (CBS)
1988
 Sesame Street (PBS)
 Pee-wee's Playhouse (CBS)
 Mister Rogers' Neighborhood (PBS)
1989
 Newton's Apple (PBS)
 3-2-1 Contact (PBS)
 Mister Rogers' Neighborhood (PBS)
 Reading Rainbow (PBS)
 Sesame Street (PBS)
1990
 Reading Rainbow (PBS)
 Captain Kangaroo (PBS)
 Mister Rogers' Neighborhood (PBS)
 Pee-wee's Playhouse (CBS)
 Sesame Street (PBS)
1991
 Sesame Street (PBS)
 Pee-wee's Playhouse (CBS)
 Reading Rainbow (PBS)
 Jim Henson's Mother Goose Stories (Disney Channel)
 Mister Rogers' Neighborhood (PBS)
1992
 Sesame Street (PBS)
 Lamb Chop's Play-Along (PBS)
 Mister Rogers' Neighborhood (PBS)
 Reading Rainbow (PBS)
 Where in the World Is Carmen Sandiego? (PBS)
1993
 Reading Rainbow (PBS)
 Barney & Friends (PBS)
 Mister Rogers' Neighborhood (PBS)
 Sesame Street (PBS)
 Where in the World Is Carmen Sandiego? (PBS)
1994
 Sesame Street (PBS)
 Lamb Chop's Play-Along (PBS)
 Mister Rogers' Neighborhood (PBS)
 Reading Rainbow (PBS)
 Where in the World Is Carmen Sandiego? (PBS)
1995
 Nick News with Linda Ellerbee (SYN)
 Where in the World Is Carmen Sandiego? (PBS)
 Reading Rainbow (PBS)
 Bill Nye the Science Guy (PBS)
 Beakman's World (CBS)
1996
 Reading Rainbow (PBS)
 Bill Nye the Science Guy (PBS)
 Nick News with Linda Ellerbee (SYN)
 Really Wild Animals (CBS)
 Where in the World Is Carmen Sandiego? (PBS)
1997
 Reading Rainbow (PBS)
 Beakman's World (CBS)
 Bill Nye the Science Guy (PBS)
 Nick News with Linda Ellerbee (Nickelodeon)
 Where in Time Is Carmen Sandiego? (PBS)
1998
 Reading Rainbow (PBS)
 Beakman's World (CBS)
 Bill Nye the Science Guy (SYN)
 Nick News with Linda Ellerbee (SYN)
 Where in Time Is Carmen Sandiego? (PBS)
1999
 Bill Nye the Science Guy (SYN)
 Animal Show (FOX)
 Nick News with Linda Ellerbee (SYN)
 Reading Rainbow (PBS)
2000
 Bill Nye the Science Guy (SYN)
 The Crocodile Hunter (Animal Planet)
 Nick News with Linda Ellerbee (SYN)
 Saved by the Bell: The New Class (NBC)
 Zoom (PBS)
2001
 Reading Rainbow (PBS)
 Between the Lions (PBS)
 Even Stevens (Disney Channel)
 Real Kids, Real Adventures (Discovery Channel)
 Zoom (PBS)
2002
 Reading Rainbow (PBS)
 Between the Lions (PBS)
 Discovery Kids Ultimate Guide to the Awesome (Discovery Kids)
 Even Stevens (Disney Channel)
 Zoom (PBS)
2003
 Reading Rainbow (PBS)
 Assignment Discovery (Discovery Channel)
 Between the Lions (PBS)
 Even Stevens (Disney Channel)
 Zoom (PBS)
2004
 Assignment Discovery (Discovery Channel)
 Jeff Corwin Unleashed (NBC)
 Between the Lions (PBS)
 Operation Junkyard (NBC)
 Scout's Safari (NBC)
 Zoom (PBS)
2005
 Reading Rainbow (PBS)
 Jeff Corwin Unleashed (NBC)
 Endurance (NBC)
 Postcards from Buster (PBS)
 Zoom (PBS)
2006
 Zoom (PBS)
 Endurance (NBC)
 Between the Lions (PBS)
 Postcards from Buster (PBS)
 Strange Days at Blake Holsey High (NBC)
2007
 Reading Rainbow (PBS)
 Assignment Discovery (Discovery Channel)
 Strange Days at Blake Holsey High (NBC)
 Endurance (NBC)
2008
 Greatest Inventions with Bill Nye (Discovery Channel)
 Jack Hanna's Into the Wild (SYN)
 Design Squad (PBS)
 Postcards from Buster (PBS)
2009
 From the Top at Carnegie Hall (PBS)
 Adventure Camp (Discovery Kids)
 FETCH! with Ruff Ruffman (PBS)
 Postcards from Buster (PBS)
2010
 The Electric Company (PBS)
 Design Squad (PBS)
 FETCH! with Ruff Ruffman (PBS)
2011
 The Electric Company (PBS)
 FETCH! with Ruff Ruffman (PBS)
 Jack Hanna's Into the Wild (SYN)
 SciGirls (PBS)
2012
 The Electric Company (PBS)
 Jack Hanna's Into the Wild (SYN)
 Biz Kid$ (PBS)
 Born to Explore with Richard Wiese (ABC)
 Everyday Health (ABC)
2013
 R. L. Stine's The Haunting Hour (The Hub)
 The Aquabats! Super Show! (The Hub)
 Everyday Health (ABC)
2014
 R. L. Stine's The Haunting Hour (The Hub)
 Animal Science (SYN)
 Game Changers with Kevin Frazier (CBS)
 Sea Rescue (ABC)
2015
 R. L. Stine's The Haunting Hour (Discovery Family)
 Made in Hollywood: Teen Edition (SYN)
 Odd Squad (PBS)
 Spooksville (Discovery Family)
 The Wildlife Docs (SYN)
2016 
 Sea Rescue (SYN)
 Annedroids (Amazon)
 Odd Squad (PBS)
 Project Mc2 (Netflix)
 The Wildlife Docs (SYN)

Outstanding Pre-School Children's Series 
1995
 Sesame Street (PBS)
 Lamb Chop's Play-Along (PBS)
 Mister Rogers' Neighborhood (PBS)
1996
 Sesame Street (PBS)
 Barney & Friends (PBS)
 Lamb Chop's Play-Along (PBS)
 Mister Rogers' Neighborhood (PBS)
1997

 Sesame Street (PBS)
Mister Rogers' Neighborhood (PBS)
1998
 Sesame Street (PBS)
 Bear in the Big Blue House (Disney Channel)
 Blue's Clues (Nickelodeon)
 Mister Rogers' Neighborhood (PBS)
1999
 Sesame Street (PBS)
 Blue's Clues (Nickelodeon)
 Mister Rogers' Neighborhood (PBS)
 Teletubbies (PBS)
2000

 Bear in the Big Blue House (Disney Channel)
 Blue's Clues (Nickelodeon)
 Mister Rogers' Neighborhood (PBS)
Sesame Street (PBS)
 Teletubbies (PBS)
2001
 Sesame Street (PBS)
 Blue's Clues (Nickelodeon)
 Mister Rogers' Neighborhood (PBS)
2002

 Blue's Clues  (Nickelodeon)
 Sesame Street (PBS)2003 Bear in the Big Blue House (Disney Channel)
 Sesame Street (PBS)
 Blue's Clues (Nickelodeon)2004 Sesame Street (PBS)
 Bear in the Big Blue House (Disney Channel)
 Blue's Clues (Nickelodeon)
2005
 Sesame Street (PBS)
 Blue's Clues (Nickelodeon)
 Hi-5 (Discovery Kids)
2006
 Sesame Street (PBS)
 Blue's Room (Nickelodeon)
 Hi-5 (Discovery Kids)
 The Paz Show (Discovery Kids)
2007
 Sesame Street (PBS)
 Hi-5 (Discovery Kids)
 Hip Hop Harry (Discovery Kids)
 It's a Big Big World (PBS)
 The Paz Show (Discovery Kids)
2008
 Sesame Street (PBS)
 Between the Lions (PBS)
 Blue's Room (Nickelodeon)
 Jack's Big Music Show (Noggin)
 Super Why! (PBS)
2009
 Between the Lions (PBS)
 Johnny and the Sprites (Disney Channel)
 Mama Mirabelle's Home Movies (PBS)
 Sesame Street (PBS)
 Wonder Pets! (Nickelodeon)
2010
 Sesame Street (PBS)
 Between the Lions (PBS)
 Wonder Pets! (Nickelodeon)
2011
 Sesame Street (PBS)
 Between the Lions (PBS)
 Mickey Mouse Clubhouse (Disney Channel)
 Yo Gabba Gabba! (Nickelodeon)
2012
 Sesame Street (PBS)
 3rd & Bird (Disney Channel)
 Super Why! (PBS)
 Wonder Pets! (Nickelodeon)
 Yo Gabba Gabba! (Nickelodeon)
2013
 Sesame Street (PBS)
The Fresh Beat Band (Nickelodeon)
 Pajanimals (NBC)
2014
 Sesame Street (PBS)
 Dino Dan (Nickelodeon)
 The Fresh Beat Band (Nickelodeon)
 Yo Gabba Gabba! (Nickelodeon)
2015
 Dino Dan: Trek's Adventures (Nickelodeon)
 Sesame Street (PBS)
 Yo Gabba Gabba! (Nickelodeon)
2016 
 Sesame Street (PBS)
 Dino Dan: Trek's Adventures (Nickelodeon)
 Mutt & Stuff (Nickelodeon)
 Sunny Side Up (Sprout)
2017
 Sesame Street (HBO)
 Bookaboo (Amazon)
 Dino Dan: Trek's Adventures (Nickelodeon)
 Mutt & Stuff (Nickelodeon)
 Sunny Side Up (Sprout)
2018
 Sesame Street (HBO)
 Dino Dana (Amazon)
 Julie's Greenroom (Netflix)
 Sprout House (Universal Kids)
2019
 Sesame Street (HBO)
 The Big Fun Crafty Show (Universal Kids)
 Dino Dana (Amazon)
 Miss Persona (YouTube.com)
 Snug's House (Universal Kids)
2020
 Sesame Street (HBO)

Outstanding Children's or Family Viewing Series
2017
 Give (NBC)
 Annedroids (Amazon)
 Odd Squad (PBS)
 This Just In (POP TV)
 Xploration DIY Sci (SYN)
2018
 Free Rein (Netflix)
 Annedroids (Amazon)
 Odd Squad (PBS)
 Top Chef Junior (Universal Kids)
 Nat Geo Kids Block (Nat Geo)

2019
 Odd Squad (PBS)
 American Ninja Warrior Junior (Universal Kids)
 Chicken Soup for The Soul's Hidden Heroes (The CW)
 Top Chef Junior (Universal Kids)
 The Who Was? Show (Netflix)

Outstanding Education or Informational Series 
2018
 Giver (ION Television)
 Mind Field (YouTube RED)
 Sea Rescue (SYN)
 The Henry Ford’s Innovation Nation (CBS)
 Xploration DIY Sci (SYN)
 Xploration Outer Space (SYN)

2019
 Weird but True! (National Geographic Kids)

Multiple wins 
33 wins
 Sesame Street

10 wins
 Reading Rainbow

5 wins
 Captain Kangaroo

3 wins
 30 Minutes
 R. L. Stine's The Haunting Hour
 Schoolhouse Rock!
 The Electric Company

2 wins
 The Big Blue Marble
 Bill Nye the Science Guy
 Jack Hanna's Into the Wild
 The Smurfs
 Zoom

Multiple nominations 
41 nominations
 Sesame Street

21 nominations
 Mister Rogers' Neighborhood

16 nominations
 Reading Rainbow

12 nominations
 Captain Kangaroo

9 nominations
 Between the Lions
 Once Upon a Classic

8 nominations
 Blue's Clues

7 nominations
 Where in the World Is Carmen Sandiego?
 Zoom

6 nominations
 Bill Nye the Science Guy
 Nick News with Linda Ellerbee

5 nominations
 Yo Gabba Gabba!
 Odd Squad

4 nominations
 Animals, Animals, Animals
 Bear in the Big Blue House
 Kids Are People Too
 Lamb Chop's Play-Along
 Pee-wee's Playhouse
 Postcards from Buster
 Schoolhouse Rock!
 30 Minutes
 3-2-1 Contact
 Zoom

3 nominations
 ABC Minute Magazine
 ABC Weekend Specials
 Assignment Discovery
 Beakman's World
 The Electric Company
 Endurance
 Even Stevens
 FETCH! with Ruff Ruffman
 Hi-5
 Jack Hanna's Into the Wild
 R.L. Stine's The Haunting Hour
 The Wonder Pets

2 nominations
 Animal Show
 Barney & Friends
 The Big Blue Marble
 Blue's Room
 Design Squad
 Dino Dan: Trek's Adventures
 The Electric Company
 Everyday Health
 Fat Albert and the Cosby Kids
 The Fresh Beat Band
 Jeff Corwin Unleashed
 The Paz Show
 The Smurfs
 Star Trek: The Animated Series
 Strange Days at Blake Holsey High
 Super Why!
 Teletubbies
 Villa Alegre
 The Wildlife Docs

References 

Children's Series
Children's television awards